The men's 20 kilometres race walk at the 2018 European Athletics Championships took place at the Olympic Stadium on 7 August.

Records

Schedule

Results

Final

References

Race Walk 20 M
Racewalking at the European Athletics Championships